Egil Jevanord (3 July 1918 – 3 April 2000) was a Norwegian footballer. He played in five matches for the Norway national football team from 1945 to 1947.

References

External links
 

1918 births
2000 deaths
Norwegian footballers
Norway international footballers
Place of birth missing
Association footballers not categorized by position